In the United States, a police precinct or ward is a geographical area patrolled by a police force. The term "precinct" may also refer to the main police station for such a geographical area.

Practices and cultures of policing often vary considerably from one precinct to another.

Police departments using the precinct system include the following:

 New York City Police Department (see Organization of the New York City Police Department#Police precincts)
 Boston Police Department
 Portland Police Bureau
 Seattle Police Department
 Buffalo Police Department
 Detroit Police Department
 Chicago Police Department
 Suffolk County Police Department
 Nassau County Police Department
 Yonkers Police Department

See also
 Police division (Britain)
 Police station

References

Police divisions
Precincts